George Dewhurst may refer to:

 George Dewhurst (director), British actor, screenwriter and film director
 George Dewhurst (cricketer), Trinidadian cricketer